Bifunctional heparan sulfate N-deacetylase/N-sulfotransferase 3 is an enzyme that in humans is encoded by the NDST3 gene. It catalyses the reaction:3'-phosphoadenylyl sulfate + α-D-glucosaminyl-[heparan sulfate](n) = adenosine 3',5'-bisphosphate + 2 H+ + N-sulfo-α-D-glucosaminyl-[heparan sulfate](n)This is a step in the production of heparin.

Clinical significance 
Mutations in NDST3 have been linked to schizophrenia.

References

Further reading 

Human proteins